Tashev (feminine: Tasheva) is a Bulgarian surname. Notable people with the surname include:

Galin Tashev  (born 1997), Bulgarian footballer
Magdalena Tasheva (born 1953), Bulgarian journalist and politician

Bulgarian-language surnames